Talar is a Persian architectural term.

Talar may also refer to:
 Talar, East Azerbaijan
 Talar, Hormozgan
 Talár (newspaper), a daily Brahui-language newspaper
 Talar, German term for ceremonial robes, see academic dress

See also 
 El Talar (disambiguation)